Terry Ramsaye (2 November 1885, Tonganoxie, Kansas - 19 August 1954, Norwalk, Connecticut) was a film historian and author of A Million and One Nights: A History of the Motion Picture [Through 1925] (New York: Simon & Schuster, 1926).

Biography
Ramsaye started his professional career as an engineer but switched to journalism when he joined the staff of the Kansas City Star and Times in 1905. In the following decade, he worked on newspapers in Leavenworth, Kansas, and in Omaha, St. Paul, Minnesota, and Chicago.

The motion picture industry was in its infancy when he joined Mutual Film Corporation in 1915. While at Mutual, he produced some Charlie Chaplin comedies and founded Screen Telegram, which achieved conspicuous success during World War I. He was one of the founding members of the Associated Motion Picture Advertisers.

Subsequently he was associated with Samuel Roxy Rothafel in the management of Broadway's Rialto and Rivoli theaters. He also launched and edited the newsreel Kinograms. After producing and editing numerous adventure films including Grass (1925) and Simba: King of the Beasts (1928) with explorers Martin and Osa Johnson, he became editor-in-chief of Pathé News and Audio Review.

In 1920, Photoplay commissioned Ramsaye to write a history of the motion picture that was serialized in the magazine from April 1921 until March 1925 as The Romantic History of the Motion Picture (and excerpts appearing in the Film Daily Yearbook), which was later published in book-form as A Million and One Nights: A History of the Motion Picture Through 1925. As one of the first extensive overviews of the development of the movie industry, it was highly influential on cinema historiography (at least in the United States) and remained in print until late in the 20th century. Thomas Edison's endorsement is included in the book. and H. L. Mencken spoke highly of it.

In 1931, Ramsaye joined the Quigley Publishing Company as editor of the Motion Picture Herald, a post he held until 1941. Subsequently, he lectured on motion pictures and contributed articles to various encyclopedias and year books. He continued his association with Quigley as consulting editor and author of a weekly column for the Herald until his death in 1954.

References

Bibliography

External links
 

American male journalists
1885 births
1954 deaths
American filmmakers
People from Tonganoxie, Kansas